Kingswood is a suburban area in South Dublin, Ireland. It is close to the county town of Tallaght and Clondalkin.

Location
The area is bordered by the M50 motorway to the NE; the Belgard Road to the SW; N7 to the NW; Katherine Tynan Road to the SE. The latter is named for writer Katherine Tynan (1859–1931), who lived in the area. Historically a part of the hinterland of Clondalkin village yet lying inside the Parish of Tallaght, the Kingswood area is now divided by the Ballymount Road, with roughly two thirds in Dublin 24, and the remainder, west of the road, in Dublin 22, and therefore served by different Garda stations.

Amenities

Facilities
Kingswood has a number of shops, a pub, a pharmacy, a church and two community centres. The old community centre now serves as a centre for hip hop dance, speech and drama classes and a karate dojo. Next to it, a newer community centre hosts community groups, sports events, and exercise and fitness clubs. The scout den, which won the Irish Architectural Innovation Award in 1989, is beside the community centre and houses the 158th Castleview Scout Group. The Roman Catholic parish church is shared with Kilnamanagh.

Education
Schools in the area include St Kilian's Junior School (founded in 1979), and St Kilian's Senior School (founded in 1986). Kingswood Community College, also known as Coláiste Pobail Coill an Rí and opened in September 2016, is a secondary school which (as of 2019) had an enrollment of 524 pupils.

Sport
Kingswood Castle FC is a local soccer club which was founded in 2013. The club, which plays in black and white kits, uses Kingswood Community College for its home matches.

St Killians GAA Club merged with St. Kevins GAA Club in Kilnamanagh in 1998.

Transport

Kingswood is served by Luas Red Line services to Tallaght/Saggart and The Point/Connolly

Dublin Bus routes 56a, 76 and 76a serve Kingswood.

References

Places in South Dublin (county)